The National Democratic Front (NDF) is a political party in Sri Lanka. The party was founded in 1995 as Democratic United National Lalith Front. In 2009, it was renamed  as New Democratic Front.

History

Presidential election—2010
General Sarath Fonseka, a former Chief of Defence Staff and commander of the Sri Lanka Army, was the party's candidate for the 2010 presidential Elections. He was contesting in the elections as the "joint opposition candidate", and was supported by the United National Party (UNP) and the Janatha Vimukthi Peramuna (JVP), the two principal opposition parties, among others. He was therefore one of the two main candidates for the election, along with then current President Mahinda Rajapaksa.

Presidential election—2015
In December 2014 presidential candidate Maithripala Sirisena deposited his bond for the 2015 presidential Elections, under the "symbol of the swan" of the National Democratic Front. Sirisena won the presidential election on 8 January, and was sworn in as the new President of Sri Lanka on 9 January 2015 after defeating the incumbent president Mahinda Rajapaksa. In 2018 Sirisena unsuccessfully tried to dissolve the parliament composed mostly of the Front's supporters and appointed Mahinda Rajapaksa as prime minister.

Presidential Election—2019
Sajith Premadasa was the Front's candidate for the 2019 presidential elections.

Electoral history

Presidential

References

1995 establishments in Sri Lanka
Political parties established in 1995
Political parties in Sri Lanka
United National Front (Sri Lanka)